Jomfrubråten is a residential area of Nordstrand in Oslo, Norway. The area was disintegrated from Ekeberg in 1920, and made a residential area when the Ekeberg Line opened in 1917. A station with the same name serves the area on the Ekeberg Line, and formerly on the Simensbråten Line, but the latter line was closed in 1967.

Citations
Notes

References

Neighbourhoods of Oslo